The 2018 Israeli Basketball League Cup, for sponsorships reasons the Winner League Cup, is the 13th edition of the pre-season tournament of the Israeli Basketball Premier League.

On October 4, 2018, Maccabi Rishon LeZion won the title for the first time after a 78–66 win over Hapoel Be'er Sheva in the Final. Cameron Long was named tournament MVP.

Bracket

Qualifying round

I. Nahariya vs. H. Be'er Sheva

M. Rishon LeZion vs. B. Herzliya

Quarterfinals

M. Ashdod vs. H. Gilboa Galil

H. Holon vs. H. Be'er Sheva

H. Jerusalem vs. H. Eilat

M. Tel Aviv vs. M. Rishon LeZion

Semifinals

H. Be'er Sheva vs. M. Ashdod

M. Rishon LeZion vs. H. Jerusalem

Final

M. Rishon LeZion vs. H. Be'er Sheva

References

2018
League Cup